The 2013 V8 Supercars Albert Park Challenge was a motor race for the Australian sedan-based V8 Supercars. It was a stand-alone event not part of the 2013 International V8 Supercars Championship, but it was attended by all of the International Championship's teams. The event was held at the Melbourne Grand Prix Circuit as the principal support event of the 2013 Australian Grand Prix.

Fabian Coulthard won the opening three races with Scott McLaughlin winning the fourth and final race.

Report

Qualifying

Notes:
 — Jason Bright was demoted two places on the grid for taking the chequered flag twice at the end of Practice 1.
 — Jonny Reid was excluded from the session for holding up Alexandre Prémat during the session.
 — Scott Pye was excluded from the session for leaving the pit lane without permission at the end of the session.

Race 1

Notes:
 — Mark Winterbottom was penalised fifty seconds for an unsafe pit release.

Race 2

Notes:
 — Craig Lowndes was relegated to third position for an unsafe pit release.

Race 3

Notes:
 — Shane van Gisbergen, Craig Lowndes, Jonathon Webb, Michael Carsuo, Todd Kelly, Jamie Whincup, Scott Pye and Dean Fiore were excluded from the results after their cars were found to be outside the allowed ignition timing variance.
 — Scott McLaughlin was due to start from sixth place on the grid, however his car failed to fire at the start of the warm up lap and he started from pit lane.

Race 4

Notes:
 — Grid positions for Race 4 were based on the combined points from the previous three races during the weekend.

References

MSS Security
March 2013 sports events in Australia